U2 Clothing was a casual-wear clothing brand founded by Michael Tien in 1980 in Hong Kong. Tien founded G2000 at the same time, with both operating under the G2000 Apparel Limited brand.  In 2007, U2, G2000, and a third brand of the same company called UWoman consolidated into a single retail chain retaining the name G2000, which offers the pre-existing product lines under new labels---G2000, G2000 blù (formerly U2), and G2000 Pink (formerly UWoman).

Locations 
As of 2016, there were 21 G2000 stores carrying the U2 product line in Hong Kong. There were also outlets in Malaysia and Singapore. Recently opened were UWoman store, an offshoot of U2 label.

References

External links

 U2 (obsolete)
 UWoman (obsolete)

Clothing brands of Hong Kong
Clothing companies established in 1980
Retail companies established in 1980
Retail companies of Hong Kong
1980 establishments in Hong Kong